William Edwards (1770–1851) was an American inventor, grandson of Jonathan Edwards, the elder. He was born in Elizabethtown, New Jersey. He introduced a valuable improvement in the manufacture of leather, whereby tanning was accomplished in a quarter of the usual time.  He invented machines which greatly advanced the production of leather in America.

References

American inventors
1770 births
1851 deaths
People from Elizabeth, New Jersey
People of colonial New Jersey
Tanners
Engineers from New Jersey